"Stagger Lee" is an American folk song based on the criminal Lee Shelton.

Stagger Lee may also refer to:

"Stagger Lee (play)", stage play
Stagger Lee (wrestler), (born 1957), wrestling ring name of James Ware 
Lee Marshall (announcer) (1949–2014), American professional wrestling announcer often referred to as "Stagger Lee"
Lee Shelton (1865–1912), an American murderer remembered in folklore as "Stagger Lee", among other variants

See also
Stagga Lee (born 1977), American rapper